The Iglesia-Parroquia Matriz de Nuestra Señora de La Concepción (Church of the Immaculate Conception) is a Catholic church located in the city of Santa Cruz de Tenerife (Canary Islands, Spain). It is the only church in the Canary Islands that has five naves.

This church was built upon the first chapel erected by the Spanish conquistadors after landing on the coast where they would later build the city. This church is the main temple of the city, which is why it is called "the Cathedral of Santa Cruz". However, it not is a cathedral; the Cathedral of La Laguna is the cathedral of Tenerife.

In 1500 work began to build a church dedicated to the Holy Cross founded by Father Juan Guerra. It was one of the first churches built on the island of Tenerife. Specifically, the Church of the Conception of Santa Cruz was built near the place where the first Christian mass observed on the island of Tenerife after the founding of the city of Santa Cruz de Tenerife was held.

The Iglesia de la Concepción is dedicated to the Immaculate Conception of the Virgin Mary. In this church is the image of St. James (patron saint of Santa Cruz de Tenerife). Inside the church is kept the cross that gave rise to the founding of the city. Stresses the organ, brought from London and acquired in 1862. In this church is a relic of St. Clement I, Pope and Martyr, donated by the Patriarch of Antioch, Mr. Sidotti. Historically this was highly revered relic in the city.

In the temple there is a small Gothic image of the fifteenth century of the Our Lady of Consolation (historical patron saint of Santa Cruz de Tenerife), of historical merit, it was the same as the Alonso Fernández de Lugo placed in the hermitage of that name. It was the first Virgin that venerated in Santa Cruz and one of the first devotions of Tenerife.

The architectural style of the church is baroque and Tuscan. The bell tower is the most identifiable part of the church. The Church of the Conception has been declared a site of cultural interest.

Gallery

See also 
Iglesia de la Concepción (San Cristóbal de La Laguna)

References

External links 
Iglesia Matriz de la Concepción de Santa Cruz de Tenerife
Church of La Concepción in Santa Cruz
Santa Cruz de Tenerife in the Official Web Page of Tenerife Tourism

Catholic Church in the Canary Islands
Buildings and structures in Santa Cruz de Tenerife
Churches in Tenerife
Bien de Interés Cultural landmarks in the Province of Santa Cruz de Tenerife